Valley of the ants is a medieval Jewish legend about Solomon that is retold in the Jewish Encyclopedia and in Quran 27:18-19.

Talmud
In the legend, as retold in the Jewish Encyclopedia, Solomon rides on a magic carpet over a valley of ants that speak to him. This legend is based on the Tanakh mentioning Solomon's wealth, wisdom, and dominion over all creatures. The legend may also be based on the Book of Proverbs, which rabbinic Judaism traditionally ascribes to Solomon, mentioning ants as exemplars of morality. Of all the legends about Solomon's dominion over all creatures, the valley of the ant is the best known one among Jews.

Comparison
The Jewish legend as compared to the one in the Quran are different except for the warning given by the queen ant, which is almost identical in both retellings regardless of the English translation of āyāt eighteen.

See also
 Solomon in Islam

External links
 Jewish Encyclopedia on Ants in Jewish Literature
 The Oklahomon: King Solomon and the Ant, a retelling of the legend

References

Jewish folklore
Naml
Solomon
Insects in religion
Insects in culture